The Desert of the Tartars is a 1976 Italian film by director Valerio Zurlini with an international cast including Jacques Perrin, Vittorio Gassman, Max von Sydow, Francisco Rabal, Philippe Noiret, Fernando Rey, and Jean-Louis Trintignant. The cast also included veteran Iranian film actor Mohammad-Ali Keshavarz.

Based on Dino Buzzati's novel The Tartar Steppe and set in about 1900, it tells the story of a young officer in an unnamed army who is sent to an ancient fortress that guards the desert frontier with the Tartars. Filmed in Arg-e Bam, Iran and released on 29 October 1976 in Italy, it was later shown as part of the Cannes Classics section of the 2013 Cannes Film Festival.

The film's striking visual style, noted for its scenery, lighting, and cinematography,  was influenced by the work of Italian painter Giorgio de Chirico. The score was by Ennio Morricone.

Plot
The first posting of the young lieutenant  Drogo is to a remote medieval castle on the frontier of the empire, facing the empty desert of the ferocious Tartars. In this lonely outpost, though no enemy appears, the garrison solemnly goes through all the rituals of military life. Isolation and stress erode them mentally and physically, leading to erratic behaviour and illness. The officers bicker continually and a platoon of soldiers mutinies when one of them is shot for alleged desertion. The commanding officer rides into the desert alone and shoots himself. In the end Drogo too falls ill and, put into a carriage to take him back to civilization, collapses dead.

Cast
 Jacques Perrin: Lt. Drogo
 Vittorio Gassman: Col. Filimore
 Giuliano Gemma: Maj. Matis
 Helmut Griem: Lt. Simeon
 Philippe Noiret: the General
 Fernando Rey: Lt. Col. Nathanson
 Laurent Terzieff: Lt. von Hamerling
 Jean-Louis Trintignant: Surgeon Maj. Rovine
 Max von Sydow: Cpt. Ortiz
 Giuseppe Pambieri: Lt. Rathenau
 Francisco Rabal: Sgt. Maj. Tronk
 Lilla Brignone: Drogo's mother

Awards

Won
 David di Donatello Awards 1977:
David Award - Best Director: Valerio Zurlini
David Award - Best Film
Special David Award - Best Actor: Giuliano Gemma
Italian National Syndicate of Film Journalists 1977:
Silver Ribbon Award - Best Director: Valerio Zurlini

Nominated
Italian National Syndicate of Film Journalists 1977:
Silver Ribbon Award - Best Supporting Actor: Giuliano Gemma

References

External links

 Notes on Cinematograph
Federica Capoferri (1998). I Tartari alle spalle. Dal romanzo di Dino Buzzati al film di Valerio Zurlini. Italica 75 (2), 226-241.

1976 films
1970s war drama films
Italian war drama films
1970s Italian-language films
Films based on Italian novels
Films based on works by Dino Buzzati
Films set in the 19th century
Films shot in Iran
Films directed by Valerio Zurlini
Films produced by Jacques Perrin
Films scored by Ennio Morricone
Films set in deserts
Films set in fortresses
1976 drama films
1970s Italian films